DPI-3290 was discovered by scientists at Burroughs Wellcome and licensed to Delta Pharmaceutical  and is a drug that is used in scientific research. It is a potent analgesic drug, which produces little respiratory depression. 

DPI-3290 acts as an agonist at both μ- and δ-opioid receptor, with an IC50 of 6.2nM at μ and 1.0nM at δ.

See also
 BW373U86
 DPI-221
 DPI-287

References 

Synthetic opioids
Delta-opioid receptor agonists
Piperazines
Benzanilides
Phenols
Fluoroarenes
Allyl compounds
Mu-opioid receptor agonists